The 2010 South American Footballer of the Year, given to the best football player in South America by Uruguayan newspaper El País through voting by journalists across the continent, was awarded to Andrés D'Alessandro of Internacional on December 30, 2010.

Andrés D'Alessandro won the award for the first time ahead of two-time holder Juan Sebastián Verón. D'Alessandro became the second Inter player to win the award.

Rankings

References
General

Specific

External links

2010
Footballer Of The Year